This is a list of extant and former coastal piers in the United Kingdom and Isle of Man and piers on the river Thames.

Coastal piers
Sources include:

England

Scotland

Wales

Isle of Man

Piers in London on the river Thames

Former piers

See also 
 List of piers
 National Piers Society

References 

Piers
List